Miroslav Štěpánek (born 15 January 1990) is a Czech footballer playing for MSV Duisburg II. His last clubs were FK Senica and Hamburger SV.

References

External links
 
 
 

1990 births
Living people
Czech footballers
Czech Republic youth international footballers
Czech Republic under-21 international footballers
SK Sigma Olomouc players
Hamburger SV II players
Kapfenberger SV players
FK Senica players
Expatriate footballers in Germany
Expatriate footballers in Austria
Expatriate footballers in Slovakia
Czech expatriate footballers
SK Schärding players

Association football defenders
FC Eintracht Norderstedt 03 players
Sportspeople from Olomouc